Friedel Rausch (27 February 1940 – 18 November 2017) was a German football player and manager. As a manager, he won with FC Luzern the Swiss championship in 1989 and the cup in 1992, thereby becoming the most successful manager in the club's history.

In 1969, Rausch produced some headlines as he was bitten by an Alsatian during the derby of Schalke and Dortmund.

End March/beginning April 2006, Rausch was diagnosed with skin cancer.

See also
 List of UEFA Cup winning managers

References

External links

Friedel Rausch at eintracht-archiv.de 
Friedel Rausch at mackolik.com 

1940 births
2017 deaths
Footballers from Duisburg
German footballers
Association football defenders
Bundesliga players
MSV Duisburg players
FC Schalke 04 players
German football managers
UEFA Cup winning managers
Bundesliga managers
FC Schalke 04 managers
Eintracht Frankfurt managers
Fenerbahçe football managers
MVV Maastricht managers
Iraklis Thessaloniki F.C. managers
FC Luzern managers
FC Basel managers
1. FC Kaiserslautern managers
LASK managers
Borussia Mönchengladbach managers
1. FC Nürnberg managers
German expatriate football managers
West German expatriate sportspeople in Greece
Expatriate football managers in Greece
West German expatriate sportspeople in Turkey
Expatriate football managers in Turkey
Deaths from cancer in Switzerland
Deaths from skin cancer
West German footballers
West German football managers
West German expatriate football managers
West German expatriate sportspeople in the Netherlands
Expatriate football managers in the Netherlands
Expatriate football managers in Switzerland
Expatriate football managers in Austria
German expatriate sportspeople in Switzerland
West German expatriate sportspeople in Switzerland
German expatriate sportspeople in Austria